The Veterans of the 36th Infantry, Texas National Guard Monument is an outdoor memorial commemorating soldiers of the 36th Infantry, Texas National Guard, installed on the Texas State Capitol grounds in Austin, Texas, United States. The monument, designed by an unknown artist, was erected in 1959. It is made of Texas Sunset Red Granite and features the unit's "T-Patch" shoulder insignia.

See also
 1959 in art

References

External links
 

1959 establishments in Texas
1959 sculptures
Granite sculptures in Texas
Monuments and memorials in Texas
Outdoor sculptures in Austin, Texas